Porodisculus is a ditypic genus of fungi in the family Fistulinaceae. It was circumscribed by American mycologist William Alphonso Murrill in 1907.

References

External links

Fistulinaceae
Agaricales genera
Taxa named by William Alphonso Murrill
Fungi described in 1907